Hunker is a borough in Westmoreland County, Pennsylvania, United States, which since 1950 has been part of the Pittsburgh metropolitan area. The population was 307 at the 2020 census.

Geography
Hunker is located at  (40.204462, -79.616218).

Demographics

At the 2000 census there were 329 people, 136 households, and 102 families living in the borough. The population density was 886.8 people per square mile (343.3/km²). There were 138 housing units at an average density of 372.0 per square mile (144.0/km²).  The racial makeup of the borough was 96.35% White, 0.61% African American, 0.30% Native American, 0.91% Asian, and 1.82% from two or more races.
Of the 136 households 25.0% had children under the age of 18 living with them, 67.6% were married couples living together, 6.6% had a female householder with no husband present, and 24.3% were non-families. 21.3% of households were one person and 11.8% were one person aged 65 or older. The average household size was 2.42 and the average family size was 2.83.

The age distribution was 17.0% under the age of 18, 6.4% from 18 to 24, 28.0% from 25 to 44, 33.4% from 45 to 64, and 15.2% 65 or older. The median age was 44 years. For every 100 females, there were 101.8 males. For every 100 females age 18 and over, there were 100.7 males.

The median household income was $40,313 and the median family income  was $43,750. Males had a median income of $32,396 versus $15,833 for females. The per capita income for the borough was $22,045. About 7.6% of families and 6.1% of the population were below the poverty line, including 7.0% of those under age 18 and 12.5% of those age 65 or over.

Notable people
Bob Garber, baseball player.
Sarah Kozer, reality TV star.

References

Boroughs in Westmoreland County, Pennsylvania
Pittsburgh metropolitan area
1929 establishments in Pennsylvania